Amaru Reto Schenkel (born 28 April 1988) is a sprinter who specializes in the 100 metres. Born in Lomé, Togo, he represents Switzerland.

Schenkel competed in both 100 and 200 m at the 2006 World Junior Championships. He finished fifth in the 100 m at the 2007 European Junior Championships. In the 4 × 100 m relay he finished fourth at the 2007 European Junior Championships and competed at the 2009 World Championships.  He competed for Switzerland at the 2011 World Championships in 100 and 200 m and the 2012 Summer Olympics in the 200 m.

His personal best times are 6.65 seconds in the 60 m (indoor), achieved in January 2012 in Magglingen; 10.19 seconds in the 100 m, achieved in July 2011 in Fribourg; and 20.48 seconds in the 200 m, achieved in May 2012 in Weinheim. He was part of the team that holds the Swiss record in the 4 × 100 m relay.

References

1988 births
Living people
Sportspeople from Lomé
Adoptees
Togolese emigrants to Switzerland
Naturalised citizens of Switzerland
Swiss male sprinters
World Athletics Championships athletes for Switzerland
Olympic athletes of Switzerland
Athletes (track and field) at the 2012 Summer Olympics
Swiss people of Togolese descent
Swiss sportspeople of African descent